Auwers may refer to:
 Auwers synthesis chemical synthesis discovered by Karl von Auwers
 Auwers (crater), a lunar crater

People
Karl von Auwers (1863 - 1939) German chemist
Arthur Auwers (1838 - 1915) German astronomer